Chili Township is one of twenty-four townships in Hancock County, in the U.S. state of Illinois.  As of the 2010 census, its population was 657 and it contained 284 housing units.

Geography

Cities, towns, villages
 Bowen

Unincorporated towns
 Chili at 
(This list is based on USGS data and may include former settlements.)

Cemeteries
The township contains these five cemeteries: Bowen, Chili, Forsyth, Old Sixteen and Payne.

Major highways
  Illinois Route 61
  Illinois Route 94

Airports and landing strips
 Crossland Landing Strip

Demographics

School districts
 Southeastern Community Unit School District 337

Political districts
 Illinois's 18th congressional district
 State House District 93
 State House District 94
 State Senate District 47

References
 United States Census Bureau 2008 TIGER/Line Shapefiles
 
 United States National Atlas

External links
 City-Data.com
 Illinois State Archives
 Township Officials of Illinois

Townships in Hancock County, Illinois
Townships in Illinois